Slow Burn is a 2005 American drama thriller film directed by Wayne Beach and starring Ray Liotta, Jolene Blalock and LL Cool J. It is notable for the extended period between production and eventual release. A crime drama, the film was produced in 2003, was finally given a showing at the 2005 Toronto International Film Festival, and finally got a proper theatrical release in 2007.

Plot
Nora Timmer, a biracial (African and European descent) woman, is being questioned by Ford Cole, the District Attorney. Nora, who is the Assistant District Attorney, claims she was being raped by Isaac Duparde when she shot him in the head. Journalist Ty Trippin interviews Ford; Ford surprises Ty by anticipating his first two questions.

Nora explains to Ford that she had first met Isaac a week earlier at a music store, where he came on to her, asking to give her a ride on the rainy night. Nora politely rebuffed his advances, but was forced to accept his offer when she found herself stranded in the rain with no cab to respond to her calls. Issac locked the door to his car when Nora tried to exit upon reaching her home, only to give her a music cassette as a compliment. Nora tells Ford that Issac waited for her in her house one night, grabbed her from behind, and raped her.

Luther Pinks, claiming to be an associate of Isaac, shows up to meet Ford and relates his version of the story, stating that Isaac's death was not self-defence, but murder. He states that Nora had seduced Isaac into falling in love and ultimately becoming obsessed with her. He tells Ford about an 'African violet' tattoo on Nora's backside to support his claims. Ford tends to believe him, as he himself had seen it when he and Nora had sex.

Isaac's home is set ablaze and Ford receives an odd voicemail from the deceased suggesting a conspiracy involving Nora. Later, Luther tells Ford of a deal Nora supposedly offered Isaac for his cousin who was recently booked on drug charges; if his aunt were to agree to sell her home to an interested party, his cousin would walk. Luther also reveals Nora's dirty little secret—that she isn't biracial but is using being a minority to benefit her career and to satisfy some strange obsession with being black.

Cast
 Ray Liotta as Ford Cole
 Jolene Blalock as Nora Timmer
 LL Cool J as Luther Pinks
 Mekhi Phifer as Isaac Duperde
 Taye Diggs as Jeffrey Sykes
 Bruce McGill as Godfrey
 Chiwetel Ejiofor as Ty Trippin / Danny
 Guy Torry as Chet Price

Release 
It was released in American theaters on April 13, 2007, but performed poorly. It had an opening weekend of $778,123 in ticket sales and closed in just 2 weeks with a domestic total of $1,237,615 and $559,641 from foreign markets for a worldwide total of $1,797,256. It ranks among the top ten widely-released films for having the biggest second weekend drop at the box office, dropping 84.7% from $676,048 to $91,748.

The DVD was released in North America on July 24, 2007 and sold 44,720 units in the opening weekend, translating to revenue of $893,953. This does not include Blu-ray/DVD sales rentals and sales tracking does not extend beyond the first week.<ref>Movie Slow Burn - DVD Sales. The Numbers. Retrieved 2010-10-31.</ref>  	

The film has themes of inter-racial dating, "passing" or pretending to be a member of another race, stereotypes included, and using a rape defense to the accusation of murder.

ReceptionSlow Burn received negative reviews from critics. , the film holds a 12% approval rating on Rotten Tomatoes, based on 34 reviews with an average rating of 3.63/10. The website's critics consensus reads: "With wooden acting and hammy, overheated dialogue, Slow Burn'' isn't so much a noir as it is a mediocre parody of one." Mekhi Phifer and Ray Liotta previously worked on ER (1994-2009)

Novel
The screenplay is based on a short story by Wayne Beach and Anthony Walton.  Wayne Beach converted the story to screenplay and directed the film.

References

External links
 
 
 
 

2005 films
2000s crime thriller films
2005 drama films
2005 independent films
2005 psychological thriller films
American independent films
Films based on short fiction
Films scored by Jeff Rona
Lionsgate films
2000s English-language films
2000s American films